The discography of English rock band The Horrors consists of five studio albums, four EPs, nineteen singles and fifteen music videos supporting the singles.

Studio albums

Remix albums

EPs

Singles

Notes

Music videos

References

External links
 The Horrors

Rock music group discographies
Discographies of British artists